Makhneva is a rural locality (a village) in Skopkortnenskoye Rural Settlement, Alexandrovsky District, Perm Krai, Russia. The population was 1 as of 2010.

Geography 
Makhneva is located 57 km north of Alexandrovsk (the district's administrative centre) by road. Skopkortnaya is the nearest rural locality.

References 

Rural localities in Alexandrovsky District